Tom Patrick Flacco (born November 2, 1994) is an American football coach and former quarterback who is currently an assistant coach for the Delaware Fightin' Blue Hens. He attended three different colleges: Western Michigan, Rutgers, and Towson. He also played baseball, and was drafted in the 32nd round of the 2014 MLB Draft by the Philadelphia Phillies. Flacco is the younger brother of New York Jets quarterback Joe Flacco. He also had stints in the Canadian Football League (CFL) with the Saskatchewan Roughriders and Ottawa Redblacks.

Early life
Flacco was born on November 2, 1994 in Audubon, New Jersey. After moving to Voorhees Township, New Jersey, he transferred after one year at Camden Catholic High School to Eastern Regional High School, where he got the starting assignment as quarterback. He played baseball and football there which led to him being drafted in the 32nd round of the 2014 MLB Draft by the Philadelphia Phillies. In football, he had over 7,250 passing yards including 2,782 yards as a senior. He also had 25 passing touchdowns and 12 rushing touchdowns in his senior year. His 7,000 plus passing yards were third most in school history at the time of his graduation.

College career

Western Michigan
His first two seasons of college football came at Western Michigan. He played two seasons with them, mostly as a backup.

Rutgers
In 2017, he transferred to Rutgers University. Due to transfer rules, he could not play in the season. The next year he transferred to Towson.

Towson

2018
His first season as a starter in college came in 2018, with the Towson Tigers. He was Towson's starting quarterback in all 12 games. He finished in the top-25 in several FCS categories, they included: finishing 3rd in total offense, 5th in passing yards, 12th in passing yards per game, 6th in passing touchdowns, 10th in completions per game, and 22nd in completion percentage. He was named CAA Offensive Player of the Week thrice, FCS Offensive Player of the Week once, and FCS Honorable Mention Player of the Week twice. He tied the Towson single season record with 28 passing touchdowns. He also was Towson's leader in rushing with 742 yards. Flacco had over 10 completions, 125 passing yards and more than one passing touchdown in every game. Flacco finished fifth for the Walter Payton Award and was named HERO Sports Third Team honors. Other honors include being named CAA Offensive Player of the Year and ECAC Offensive Player of the Year. Tom was also named All-CAA First Team.

2019 (football)
His final season was in 2019. He finished 13th in voting for the Walter Payton award, being the first Towson player to ever be a finalist two separate seasons. In only two seasons with Towson, he was third in their history for passing touchdowns with 50. On October 19, he threw and ran for a combined 6 touchdowns in a win over Bucknell. He had 2,831 passing yards for 22 touchdowns in the season.

2019 (baseball)
He made a return to baseball in 2019 after not playing since 2014. He played in 44 games with 38 starts.

Professional career

Flacco went undrafted in the 2020 NFL Draft. He reportedly had tryouts with the Arizona Cardinals, but did not sign with them. In January 2021, Flacco signed a contract with the Saskatchewan Roughriders of the Canadian Football League. He was released on July 30, 2021. On October 20, 2021, Flacco was signed by the Ottawa Redblacks.

Coaching career
In 2022, Flacco was named a volunteer assistant coach of offense for the Delaware Fightin' Blue Hens football team.

Personal life
Flacco has five older siblings. His oldest brother, Joe, is a quarterback for the New York Jets, and previously the Baltimore Ravens, Philadelphia Eagles, and Denver Broncos. Another brother, Mike, played four years of minor league baseball in the Baltimore Orioles organization, and was also briefly in the NFL. His brother John played as a safety at Stanford.

References

External links
espn.com profile

1994 births
Living people
American football quarterbacks
American players of Canadian football
Baseball players from New Jersey
Canadian football quarterbacks
Eastern Regional High School alumni
Ottawa Redblacks players
People from Audubon, New Jersey
People from Voorhees Township, New Jersey
Players of American football from New Jersey
Players of Canadian football from New Jersey
Rutgers Scarlet Knights football players
Saskatchewan Roughriders players
Sportspeople from Camden County, New Jersey
Towson Tigers baseball players
Towson Tigers football players
Western Michigan Broncos football players
Delaware Fightin' Blue Hens football coaches